Tragocephala caerulescens is a species of beetle in the family Cerambycidae. It was described by Karl Jordan in 1894. It is known from Gabon, Chad, the Democratic Republic of the Congo, Cameroon, and Senegal.

Varieties
 Tragocephala caerulescens var. plagiata Aurivillius, 1927
 Tragocephala caerulescens var. gorilloides Aurivillius, 1927

References

caerulescens
Beetles described in 1894